Until 1999, Tanzania, Kenya and Uganda shared a telephone numbering plan, in which subscribers were only required to dial the trunk code, area code and number. In that year, Tanzania adopted a new numbering plan. Calls to Kenya and Uganda require a regional prefix rather than having to use full international dialling. To call Kenya from Tanzania, subscribers dial 005 instead of +254, while to call Uganda, they dial 006 rather instead of +256. To call Tanzania from Kenya and Uganda, subscribers dial 007 instead of +255.

Format

 +255 XXX XXX XXX +255XX XXX XXXX calling from outside Tanzania
 0XXX XXX XXX or 0XX XXX XXXX - calling within Tanzania
The NSN length is nine digits.
 Subscriber Number length under 2X, 4X, 6X and 7X NDCs is 7 digits.
 Subscriber Number length under 8XY and 90X NDCs is 6 digits.

Geographic number for fixed telephony services (area codes)

VoIP services
VoIP services begin with 41:

Mobile telephone numbers
Mobile numbers start with 6 or 7:

Special and premium rate numbers
Non-geographic numbering begins 8 or 9:

Short codes

112 replaced 999 for emergency calls as of 2000-10-31.
118 replaced 991 for directory enquiries as of 2000-10-31.

External links
World Telephone Numbering Guide

References

Tanzania
Communications in Tanzania
Telephone numbers